Major General Juan César Cordero Dávila (June 7, 1904 – July 20, 1965), was the commanding officer of the 65th Infantry Regiment during the Korean War, rising to become one of the highest ranking ethnic officers in the United States Army.

His active military career began on June 1, 1942, when he was summoned to serve in World War II. On January 2, 1952, he was reassigned to Third Infantry Division took over the 65th, commanding them along a set of Korean and Belgium battalions and platoon from Luxembourg. He also served as an S-4 and as executive officer of the 65th. On July 20, 1965, Cordero died during an accident involving a plane.

Early years

Cordero Dávila, born in barrio Trujillo Bajo of Carolina, Puerto Rico, lived in the San Juan Metropolitan Area. He started his education in his native barrio, under Isaías González. Cordero completed his elementary education in the public schools of Carolina. Midway through high school, he joined the UPR's high school, from which he graduated. Afterwards he was accepted at the "Colegio de Agricultura y Artes Mecanicas" (CAAM) (now the University of Puerto Rico at Mayagüez, where he actively participated in that institution's Army ROTC program. In 1925, he earned his degree as a civil engineer. He also gained his United States Army Reserve commission as a Second Lieutenant

He was then employed by the Department of Interior and later joined the Irrigation Service in Isabela. When he was 23 years old, Cordero was named Superintendent of Irrigation, remaining in the office until 1938. Cordero was then named director of the Housing Authority of Puerto Rico. On May 25, 1930, Cordero married Elvira Rabell, with whom he had three children, Elvira, César Guillermo and César Narciso.

World War II
Cordero Dávila was assigned to the 65th Infantry Regiment at Camp Las Casas in Santurce, Puerto Rico. In 1942, the regiment underwent an extensive training program and in 1943, was sent to Panama to protect the Pacific and the Atlantic sides of the isthmus. In 1944, the regiment was sent to North Africa, arriving at Casablanca, where they underwent further training.  By April 29, 1944, the regiment had landed in Italy and moved on to Corsica.  In Corsica they were assigned to guard Army Air Force installations.  On September 22, 1944, the 65th Infantry landed in Toulon, France and was committed to action on the Maritime Alps at Peira Cava.  On December 13, the 3rd Battalion under the command of Cordero Dávila, then a Lieutenant Colonel, relieved the 2nd Battalion of the Japanese-American 442nd "Nisei" Infantry Regiment which was under the command of fellow Puerto Rican Col. Virgil R. Miller.  The 65th Infantry faced the German 34th Infantry Divisions 107th Infantry Regiment and participated in a number of small unit engagements at Turine, Espinal-Chenimeril and Leintray.

Cordero-Dávila served with the regiment in World War II for over three and a half years, advancing from the Regimental S-4 to Battalion Executive Officer, Battalion Commander of the regiment's 3rd Battalion, and Regimental Executive Officer.  He also served for short periods during World War II as the Regimental Commander. After the war concluded, Cordero returned to the reserve for six months, then taking command of the Puerto Rico National Guard's 296th Combat Group. On September 10, 1950, Cordero was activated again due to the Korean War, commanding the 296th and overseeing Campamento Tortuguero, Campamento Salinas and Forts Losey and the Henry Barracks.

Korean War
When World War II came to an end, Cordero Dávila returned to Puerto Rico and assumed the commanded of the 296th Regimental Combat Team.  He was responsible for training most of the men serving in the 65th Infantry.

On August 26, 1950, the 65th Infantry under the command of Colonel Julian C. Lindsey, left Puerto Rico for Pusan, Korea and arrived there on September 23, 1950. Under the command of Colonel Linsey, the 65th became the third Regiment to cross the Han Ton River. The 65th was the Regiment which took and held Cherwon and they were also instrumental in breaking the Iron Triangle of Hill 717 on July 1951. On November 1951, the Regiment fought off an attack by two Regimental size enemy units, with success.

On February 8, 1952, General J. Lawton Collins, the Army Chief of Staff, named Colonel Cordero Dávila, the highest-ranking Puerto Rican in the Army, Commanding officer of the 65th Regiment.

On July 3, 1952, the Regiment defended the MLR for 47 days and saw action at Cognac, King and Queen with successful attacks on Chinese People's Volunteer Army (PVA) positions. On July 20, after an enemy counterattack, Cordero Dávila exposed himself to enemy fire and helped to evacuate the wounded men of Company "C" and guide them to safety. Cordero Dávila, a Bronze Star recipient, was awarded the Silver Star for his actions. On October the Regiment also saw action in the Cherwon Sector and on Iron Horse, Hill 391, whose lower part was called "Jackson Heights".

In September 1952, the 65th Infantry was holding on to a position known as "Outpost Kelly". The PVA overran the hill in what became known as the Battle of Outpost Kelly. Twice the 65th Regiment was overwhelmed by PVA artillery and driven off. For his performance during this time, Cordero was congratulated by Gen. Thomas Cross, who labeled one of the attacks supervised by Cordero as "the best attack [that he] witnessed in three wars".

Col. Juan César Cordero Dávila was relieved from his command as regimental commander by Col. Chester B. DeGavre, a non-Hispanic West Point graduate and a "continental," officer from the mainland United States.*

Silver Star citation

Later years
On January 2, 1953, Cordero returned to Puerto Rico and retook command of the 296th. He also resumed his civil work in the housing projects. While working as Executive Director of CRUV, he was named Puerto Rico's Adjutant General, replacing Esteves who had retired due to health issues. Cordero took office on October 1, 1958, and was promoted to the rank of Brigadier General. On July 6, 1960, Cordero was ascended to the rank of Division General.

The 65th Infantry was deactivated when it returned to Puerto Rico in 1956. General Cordero Dávila, persuaded the Department of the Army to transfer the 65th Infantry from the regular Army to the Puerto Rican National Guard. This was the only unit ever transferred from active component Army to the Army Guard.  He also served as executive director of the Puerto Rico Housing Authority and Housing Coordinator for the Governor of Puerto Rico Luis Muñoz Marín. On July 20, 1965, Major General Juan César Cordero Dávila died in an airplane related accident. He was buried at the Puerto Rico National Cemetery with full military honors on July 22 and was survived by his wife Elvira Rubell and three children.

Legacy

The Government of Puerto Rico named the building which houses the Housing Department of Puerto Rico, located at Avenida Barbosa in Rio Piedras, Puerto Rico The Juan César Cordero Dávila Building in his honor.  The government also named a public housing project in San Juan after him. His son César Narciso would follow in his footsteps, becoming an officer in the PRNG.

Military awards and decorations
Among Cordero Dávila's decorations were the following:

Badges:
  Combat Infantryman Badge

Foreign decoration

The Bravery Gold Medal of Greece was given by the Government of Greece to the 65th Infantry Regiment and to the members of the regiment who fought in the Korean War.
  Chryssoun Aristion Andrias (Bravery Gold Medal of Greece)
Congressional Gold Medal

On June 10, 2014, President Barack Obama, signed the legislation known as  "The Borinqueneers CGM Bill" at an official ceremony. The Bill honors the 65th Infantry Regiment with the Congressional Gold Medal.

Promotions

See also

List of Puerto Ricans
List of Puerto Rican military personnel
Puerto Ricans in World War II
65th Infantry
Puerto Rico Adjutant General
Borinqueneers Congressional Gold Medal

References
Citations

Bibliography

Further reading
Puertorriquenos Who Served With Guts, Glory, and Honor. Fighting to Defend a Nation Not Completely Their Own; by : Greg Boudonck;

External links
Puerto Rico Herald
 Army Magazine
Silver Star Citation

1904 births
1965 deaths
United States Army personnel of World War II
United States Army personnel of the Korean War
People from Carolina, Puerto Rico
Puerto Rico Adjutant Generals
Puerto Rican Army personnel
United States Army reservists
United States Army generals
National Guard (United States) generals
Recipients of the Silver Star
Puerto Rican military officers
Puerto Rico National Guard personnel